Zeke Thurston (born July 15, 1994) is a Canadian professional rodeo cowboy who specializes in saddle bronc riding. He is a three-time (2016, 2019, and 2022) Professional Rodeo Cowboys Association (PRCA) World Champion saddle bronc rider.

Early life
Thurston was born on July 15, 1994, in Big Valley, Alberta, Canada.  Thurston attended Sheridan College.  His father, Skeeter Thurston, was a six-time National Finals Rodeo (NFR) qualifier. Thurston graduated from Sheridan College.

Professional career
Thurston competes in the PRCA circuit. In 2016, he won the Saddle Bronc Riding World Championship at the National Finals Rodeo. He beat Jacobs Crawley by less than $3,000. He solidified his crown by winning the Average at the 2016 NFR as well as his first NFR go around.

In 2019, Thurston won the Saddle Bronc Riding World Championship for a second time. On his way there, he broke the yearly earnings record for the event. Thurston also earned $347,056 which was more than Ryder Wright's earnings of $284,938 in 2017. Thurston said he wanted this second championship even more than the first one. Thurston also became the first competitor since 2011 to win both a PRCA world championship and a Canadian Professional Rodeo Association national championship the same year.

Thurston got his first NFR round win, in round 6, of the 2016 NFR by making an 88.5 point ride on the bucking horse Black Hills from C5 Rodeo.

He also won rounds 6 and 9 of the 2018 NFR. He also won rounds 1,7 and 9 of the 2019 NFR to capture his second world championship. His round 7 victory fell just half a point shy of the 93 point arena record set by Billy Etbauer. Thurston was riding Northcott Macza's "Get Smart" when he made his 92.5 point ride.

Thurston came just one point shy of the all time world record saddle bronc ride with an 94 point ride. He rode aboard one of the Calgary Stampede's broncs, Special Delivery, at the 2019 Hardgrass Bronc Match in Pollockville, Alberta. He is also a three-time winner of the $100,000 prize at the Calgary Stampede.

At the 2022 NFR, Thurston won the saddle bronc riding average for the second time in his career, which included winning Round 4. He would also win the Top Gun Award for the first time in his career by winning the most money in one event by any NFR contestant. He also won his third PRCA saddle bronc riding world championship.

Personal life
Thurston resides in Big Valley, Alberta, with his wife Jayne and their 2 children. His interests include ranching, roping, deer hunting, and fishing. He continues to play amateur hockey since childhood.

References

1994 births
Living people
Saddle bronc riders